The Dead Abel is an 1832 oil on paper painting by British-American painter Thomas Cole, the founder of the Hudson River School. It depicts the dead biblical figure Abel. It was originally intended to be a study for a larger painting; however, this other work was never created.

Artist's background

Tom Christopher wrote that “[Thomas] Cole’s greatest artistic asset proved to be his untutored eye.”  Cole emigrated to America with his family in the spring of 1819 at the age of eighteen.  As a child, his surroundings were of Lancashire, England, an area known to be an epicenter of Britain’s primarily industrial region.  Because of this, Cole was granted an additional clarity of and sensitivity to the vibrancy of American landscapes awash with color, a stark contrast to the bleak and subdued landscapes of the country he left behind. As he aged and recognized his own mortality, Cole transitioned away from natural landscape paintings to focus on works conveying religious and spiritual themes.

History
Cole painted The Dead Abel at the Accademia di San Luca in Florence, Italy. Cole intended the work to be a study for a larger painting which would have depicted Adam and Eve discovering Abel's body. This painting was never made.

References

Works cited
 Christopher, Tom. "Living Off the Landscape: How Thomas Cole and Frederick Church made Themselves at Home in the Hudson River Valley." Humanities 30, no. 4 (2009):6-11.
 Noble, Luis Legrand. The Life and Works of Thomas Cole. Edited by Elliot S. Vesell Cambridge, Massachusetts: The Belknap Press of Harvard University Press, 1964.
 Great Northern Catskills of Greene County. “Hudson River School of Art”. http://www.greatnortherncatskills.com/arts-culture/hudson-river-school-art.

External links
 Explore Thomas Cole provided by the National Park Service

1832 paintings
Paintings by Thomas Cole
Hudson River School paintings
Cultural depictions of Cain and Abel
Paintings about death
Paintings depicting figures from the Book of Genesis